O'Shaughnessy's gecko (Gonatodes concinnatus) is a diurnal species of gecko found in Ecuador (Canelos), Colombia, Venezuela, Brazil, and Peru.

References

Gonatodes
Reptiles of Brazil
Reptiles of Colombia
Reptiles of Ecuador
Reptiles of Peru
Reptiles of Venezuela
Reptiles described in 1881
Taxa named by Arthur William Edgar O'Shaughnessy